Binjai Station, (BIJ)—formerly known as Timbang Langkat Station—is railway station located in Binjai, Indonesia, in the area near Binjai Bus station. Unlike most other stations in North Sumatra which have different architecture, Binjai station remains a colonial-style building from the time of its first construction.

Binjai station  has no rail service towards Besitang because this railroad was closed. In addition, the station no longer serves for the transportation of goods. In 2016 there were plans to reactivate the railway to connect Medan to Banda Aceh; it was expected to be operational in 2017. In the past, there were four stations between Medan: Binjai, namely as Sikambing, Sunggal, Sungai Semayang, and Diski station.

Previously, Binjai station had crossroads between Besitang and Kuala. But the railway to Kuala remains only in traces now.

Binjai station used to have six railway tracks, but nowadays only 3 tracks remain. At the north end of the station there is a water tower and there are also still two water cranes remaining for steam locomotives in the far north and south of the station.

Services

References

External links
 

Binjai
Railway stations in North Sumatra
Cultural Properties of Indonesia in North Sumatra